Janet Shirley Koper (July 22, 1931 – December 18, 1988) was a provincial level politician from Alberta, Canada. She served as a member of the Alberta Legislature from 1982 to 1988 sitting as a member of the governing Progressive Conservative caucus.

Political career
Koper started her career as an educator, principal, and later a superintendent for the Calgary Public School Board. She ran for a seat to the Alberta Legislature for the first time in the 1982 Alberta general election. She won handily defeating four other candidates to hold the Calgary-Foothills electoral district for the governing Progressive Conservative caucus. During her term as MLA, Janet sponsored three crucial bills:  The Public Health Act, The Child Transportation Safety Act, and the Maintenance Enforcement Act.

She was re-elected with a reduced majority to her second term in the 1986 Alberta general election. She died of cancer while still holding office in 1988.

References

External links
Legislative Assembly of Alberta Members Listing

1931 births
1988 deaths
Politicians from Calgary
Politicians from Edmonton
Progressive Conservative Association of Alberta MLAs
Women MLAs in Alberta
20th-century Canadian women politicians